Bayou Sorrel is an unincorporated community in Iberville Parish, Louisiana, United States.

Bayou Sorrel is also known as "down the bayou" or as some people like to say "sol".

Notes

Unincorporated communities in Iberville Parish, Louisiana
Unincorporated communities in Louisiana